Matija Češković (born May 20, 1981) is a Croatian professional basketball Guard who last played for Šanac Karlovac.

External links
 Matija Ceskovic Player Profile on Realgm.com
 Matija Ceskovic Basketball Player Profile on Eurobasket.com

References

1981 births
Croatian men's basketball players
Living people
Point guards
KK Zrinjevac players
HKK Široki players
Kolossos Rodou B.C. players
Kaposvári KK players
KK Bosna Royal players
PVSK Panthers players
KK Dubrava players
Czarni Słupsk players
Peramatos Ermis B.C. players
BC Orchies players
CSU Sibiu players
KK Kvarner 2010 players
BC Mureș players
Helios Suns players